The 1937 Australian federal election was held in Australia on 23 October 1937. All 74 seats in the House of Representatives, and 19 of the 36 seats in the Senate were up for election. The incumbent UAP–Country coalition government, led by Prime Minister Joseph Lyons, defeated the opposition Labor Party under John Curtin.

The election is notable in that the Country Party achieved its highest-ever primary vote in the lower house, thereby winning nearly a quarter of all lower-house seats. At the 1934 election nine seats in New South Wales had been won by Lang Labor. Following the reunion of the two Labor parties in February 1936, these were held by their members as ALP seats at the 1937 election. With the party's wins in Ballaarat and Gwydir (initially at a by-election on 8 March 1937), the ALP had a net gain of 11 seats compared with the previous election.

This was the first federal election that future Prime Ministers Harold Holt and Arthur Fadden contested as members of parliament, having entered parliament at the 1935 Fawkner by-election and 1936 Darling Downs by-election respectively.

Results

House of Representatives

Notes
 Four members were elected unopposed, all from the Labor Party.
 Independents: Alexander Wilson (Wimmera, Vic) and Percy Spender (Warringah, NSW).
 The member for Northern Territory, Adair Blain (independent), had voting rights only for issues relating to the Territory, and so is not included in the table.

Senate

Seats changing hands

 Members listed in italics did not contest their seat at this election.

See also
 Candidates of the Australian federal election, 1937
 Members of the Australian House of Representatives, 1937–1940
 Members of the Australian Senate, 1938–1941

References
University of WA  election results in Australia since 1890
Two-party-preferred vote since 1937

External links

Federal elections in Australia
1937 elections in Australia
October 1937 events